Hieroglyph was a proposed American action-adventure drama series created by Travis Beacham, who served as executive producer on the show along with Katherine Pope, Peter Chernin and Miguel Sapochnik. Sapochnik directed the first episode. The series was produced by 20th Century Fox Television and Chernin Entertainment. Originally scheduled for a spring 2015 premiere, it was announced at the end of June 2014 that Fox had shut down production and canceled the series before airing an episode.

Cast 
 Max Brown as Ambrose 
 Reece Ritchie as Pharaoh Shai Kanakht
 Condola Rashād as Nefertari Kanakht, the Pharaoh's half-sister
 John Rhys-Davies as Vocifer 
 Caroline Ford as Peshet
 Antony Bunsee as Rawser
 Kelsey Chow as Lotus Tenry
 Hal Ozsan as Bek Penroy

Development 
On October 17, 2013, Fox announced that it had dropped the pilot stage for Hieroglyph and would straight away commit to a 13-episode season. The first episode was shot in Morocco in early 2014. The series was expected to continue filming in March 2014 in New Mexico at the Albuquerque Studios.  Kevin Reilly for Fox Entertainment has stated that "We wanted to do a show about deceit, sex, intrigue in the court and fantastical goings on – no better place to set that than ancient Egypt."

Fox canceled the series in June 2014, saying the series was not coming together the way executives had hoped.

References

External links
 

Television pilots not picked up as a series
Unaired television shows